Paul James Tosh (born 18 October 1973 in Arbroath) is a Scottish footballer. He started his career with his local club Arbroath before a move in 1993 to Tayside neighbours Dundee who paid an Arbroath club record fee of £120,000 to take Paul to Dens Park.

Following three years at Dens Park, he moved to Hibernian with Lee Power for a combined fee of £200,000. However, Jim Duffy, who had signed Tosh, was soon fired from his position as manager. After struggling to get into the first team under Alex McLeish, he was sent out on loan to Partick Thistle and then Exeter City, before he moved to Raith Rovers. Paul scored 13 goals over his two seasons there but was released by the Kirkcaldy outfit.

A former Second Division player of the year, Tosh's consistent ability to score goals saw "Tosher" rack up nearly 90 goals in Forfar colours, averaging slightly better than a goal every other game. Tosh was player-assistant manager during the reign of former Forfar manager George Shaw. After only one match being caretaker manager he left on emergency loan to local rivals and his hometown team Arbroath in 2007. He returned to Arbroath in July 2007 and continued his scoring into season 2007–08.

Tosh signed for Tayport Juniors in June 2011.

Paul started working in the Construction Industry after his football career, notably spending time with Hillcrest Housing Association and Persimmon Homes North Scotland  

Paul is also one of the committee members at Arbroath Victoria.

References

External links

1973 births
Arbroath F.C. players
Dundee F.C. players
Exeter City F.C. players
Association football forwards
Forfar Athletic F.C. players
Hibernian F.C. players
Living people
Partick Thistle F.C. players
Raith Rovers F.C. players
Montrose F.C. players
Scottish Football League players
Scottish footballers
Peterhead F.C. players
Cove Rangers F.C. players
Tayport F.C. players